Segadores de Vida is a Non-denominational Christian church located in Southwest Ranches, Florida. The senior pastor of the church is Ruddy Gracia.

History 
The church was founded in April 1992, the Senior Pastors and founders are Ruddy and Maria Gracia. The Garcia's attended Christ for the Nations Institute in Dallas, Texas, for their biblical studies. They have focused on an outreach to the Hispanic community in South Florida. Their efforts have been covered in Strang Communications magazine Vida Cristiana and the evangelical Christian periodical, Outreach. The weekly attendance averages 8,000, including men, women, youth and children.
In 2016, the church moved in to a new building in Southwest Ranches FL.

See also 
 List of the largest churches in the USA

References

External links 

Evangelical megachurches in the United States
Megachurches in Florida
Churches in Miami
Pentecostal churches in Florida
Christian organizations established in 1992
1992 establishments in Florida